The Royal Order of the Two-Sicilies was a dynastic order of knighthood of the Kingdom of Naples and the Kingdom of Two Sicilies. The order was established 24 February 1808 by Joseph Bonaparte, who, at the time, was the King of Naples.  The order was expanded and continued under the rule of Joachim Murat but was ultimately suppressed by Ferdinand I of the Two Sicilies in 1819.  Those Knights of the Order of the Two-Sicilies who were still active were instead awarded the Order of Saint George and Reunion.

Description
The decoration was a five-pointed red enameled gold star bearing the coat of arms of Naples and Sicily and the inscription Joseph Neapoles Siciliarum rex instituit. The original badge was surmounted by an eagle, but Ferdinand I modified it by replacing the eagle with the royal crown and changing the inscription to Ferdinandus Borbonius utriusque Siciliae Rex P.F.A..

Recipients 
 Commanders
 Léonard Jean Aubry Huard de Saint-Aubin

References

External links
Collar of the Order from the Murat era
“The Royal Order of Two-Sicilies” web page

 
Awards established in 1808
Awards disestablished in 1819
1808 establishments in Italy
Joachim Murat